Lomodo IVa is a 1981 role-playing game supplement for Traveller published by Group One.

Contents
Lomodo IVa is an adventure setting describing the planet Lomoda IVa, a world on which two intelligent races have died off, leaving the planet in the possession of a semi-intelligent jellyfish-like species, the Osp.

Publication history
Lomodo IVa was published in 1981 by Group One as a 16-page book with a large color map.

Reception
William A. Barton reviewed Lomodo IVa in The Space Gamer No. 48. Barton commented that "All in all, Lomodo IVa, while having its points of interest, seems the least inspired of any of Group One's adventures thus far. If you haven't thought much of their past products, you'll really hate this one. Unless you're a collector of all Traveller items or are hard up for a place to adventure, pass this one by."

References

Role-playing game supplements introduced in 1981
Traveller (role-playing game) supplements